The Thirty-third Street Bridge in Philadelphia carries Thirty-third Street (U.S. Route 13) over the former course of Master Street in the Brewerytown section of North Philadelphia, near Fairmount Park.  The bridge was built in 1901 with an unusual skewed arch, and listed on the National Register of Historic Places in 1988. Ashlar, or dressed stone, covers the exterior of the arch, but the unusual skewed ribs are made of brick. The underpass is now inside an industrial area and normally closed even to foot traffic. The tracks of the former Pennsylvania Railroad are located just to the north and pass under a large modern bridge on Thirty-third Street.

See also

 List of bridges documented by the Historic American Engineering Record in Pennsylvania
 List of bridges on the National Register of Historic Places in Pennsylvania

References

External links

, 11 data pages, 1 photo caption page

Road bridges on the National Register of Historic Places in Pennsylvania
Bridges completed in 1901
Bridges in Philadelphia
Skew arch bridges
Historic American Engineering Record in Philadelphia
Lower North Philadelphia
National Register of Historic Places in Philadelphia
U.S. Route 13
Bridges of the United States Numbered Highway System
Brick bridges in the United States
Stone arch bridges in the United States
1901 establishments in Pennsylvania